The Hood River County Library and Georgiana Smith Park was listed on the National Register of Historic Places in 1998.

It was a community effort to get the library built, with a woman's club leading, and eventually securing a $17,500 Carnegie grant.  The library was built in 1913–14.  The Georgiana Smith Park was completed in 1935.

References

Library buildings completed in 1914
Libraries on the National Register of Historic Places in Oregon
Buildings and structures in Hood River, Oregon
Libraries in Oregon
Parks on the National Register of Historic Places in Oregon
National Register of Historic Places in Hood River County, Oregon
1913 establishments in Oregon
Libraries established in 1913